Dashkhani (also Romanized as Dāshkhānī; also known as Kalāteh-ye Bahbūd') is a village in Miankuh Rural District, Chapeshlu District, Dargaz County, Razavi Khorasan Province, Iran. At the 2006 census, its population was 39, in 10 families.

References 

Populated places in Dargaz County